Calcutta Jain Temple (also known as Parshwanath Temple) is a Jain temple at Badridas Temple Street, Gouribari in Maniktala and a major tourist attraction of Kolkata (Calcutta), India. The temple was built by a Jain named Rai Badridas Bahadoor Mookim in 1867. Pratishtha was done by Sri Kalyansurishwarji Maharaj.

History 

The Parasnath or Parshwanath Jain Temple of Kolkata was built by Ray Badridas Bahadur in 1867. Thousands of people visit this temple annually. The Parasnath Jain Temple is actually a complex of 4 temples. The main shrine is dedicated to Shitalanatha, tenth tirthankara. The pratishtha was performed by Sri Kalyansurishwarji Maharaj. The four main temples are Shitalnath Ji Temple, Chandraprabhu Ji temple, Mahavir Swami Temple and Dadawadi and Kushal Ji Maharaj Temple where the footprint of Jain Acharya Jin Dutt Kushal Suri is kept and worshiped. Towards the south of the temple of Sri Sitala Nath Ji, lies the shrine of Sri Chanda Prabhujidev, which was built by Ganeshlal Kapoorchand Jahar in the year 1895.

Main Jain temple is the Paryushan where festival is celebrated in Bhadrav month. During this period the Jains observe Ahimsa, listen to recitations of scriptures of worship and perform charitable deeds. The last day of festival is called Samvatsari. It is one of the most important Jain temples in Kolkata. The deity of Lord Shitalnath Ji is seated in the sanctum sanctorum, and his diamond-studded forehead is a major attraction for the visitors. The other deities are also beautifully decorated with semi-precious stones and precious metals.

About temple 

The complex is subdivided into 4 temples:
 Shitalnath temple
 Parshvanath temple
 Chandraprabhu temple
 Mahavir temple
 Dadawadi

The temple is dedicated to Parshwanath, who was the 23rd Jain Tirthankar and he is worshipped by the Jains. This is one of the most important Jain temples in Kolkata. The place is famous all over that is why devout Jains from distant parts of India flock to the Temple precincts all round the year. The temple consists of four temples inside of it. The deity of Lord Shitalnathji is seated in the sanctum sanctorum and his diamond-studded forehead is a major attraction for the visitors. 

There are three other shrines dedicated to Chanda Prabhujidev, Dadagarudev Shri Jin Kushal Suriji Maharaj. The last temple is dedicated to Lord Mahaveera, who was the last Tirthankara of the Jain tradition.

Architecture 

Pareshnath Jain Temple, Kolkata has displays of exquisite designs and it is an impressive structure consisting of mirror-inlaid pillars and windows that have made of stained glass. The temple is surrounded by three beautiful veranda. The walls of the temple features mosaics and other ornamental work. The main shrine is divied into three sections, inner most section enshrines idols of Tirthankaras. The marble images wear gold necklace, silver lotus pedestal and a big diamond inlaid forehead. The outer section is richly decorate with ornate mosaic glasswork on the wall; the ceiling and column are richly ornated. This section also features a chandelier with over a hundred branches. Outside the temple is a garden with Indian and exotic plants. The garden is full of sculptures and fountain in the middle. It is considered a testimony of architecture and artistry.

The interiors of the temple are splendidly beautiful, along with the outdoors, which are surrounded with many beautifully colored flower gardens and fountains. There is a small stream flowing through it, which also has a great variety of flowers all around it. The fountains look brilliant when water gushes out of them in perfect harmonization. A well-maintained reservoir, adds up to the surrounding beauty. Colourful fishes swarm the surface of the glistening water at the slightest hint of food grains. The floor of the temple is elaborately paved with marble that gives it a solemn look and also a mark of purity. The temple exhibits extraordinary artistic tendencies that are visible in the whole pattern of the decoration of the interiors and the exteriors. It also displays paintings of renowned painter Ganesh Muskare. Chandeliers or Jhar Battis are another feature that makes the interiors sparkle and lends the extra shimmer to the serenity of the temple.

Temple complex

The interiors of the temple are lavishly decorated with high quality mirrors and glasses. The quintessential Jain temple chandeliers (Jhar Battis) decorate the ceilings adding beauty to the top. The floor is intricately paved with marble and embellished with exquisite floral designs that provide a classy look to this colossal architecture. In the interior, the temple walls are adorned by paintings of the renowned painter Ganesh Muskare. The Temple gateway is splendidly eye-catching.

Trivia of Parswanath Jain Temple

There is a lamp, which burns with ghee inside the sanctum sanctorum, which has been continuously burning ever since the initiation of the temple since 1867. The lamp bears silent testimony to the contemporary world since ages and it is wonderful to acknowledge the mysticism associated with.
The temple celebrates Paryushan in Bhadrav month (between 16 August and 15 September). Jains believe in ahimsa or peace and are committed to charitable deeds.

Gallery

See also 

 Jainism in Bengal

References

Citations

Source 
 
 
 
 

Jain temples in West Bengal
Tourist attractions in Kolkata
Religious buildings and structures in Kolkata
19th-century Jain temples